Poindexter Peak is a snow-covered peak (1,215 m) rising 4 nautical miles (7 km) southeast of Bennett Bluff, along the west side of upper Berry Glacier in Marie Byrd Land. Mapped by United States Geological Survey (USGS) from surveys and U.S. Navy air photos, 1959–65. Named by Advisory Committee on Antarctic Names (US-ACAN) for Monte F. Poindexter, United States Antarctic Research Program (USARP) meteorologist at Byrd Station, 1962.

Mountains of Marie Byrd Land